Aleksander Kan (31 October 1925 - 22 January 2017) was a Russian born historian and professor at Uppsala University in Sweden.

Biography 
Aleksander Kan was born in Moscow. During World War II he served as an interpreter in the Soviet Army 1944 – 1945. 
In the Soviet Union he wrote several books about the history of Scandinavia from a Marxist standpoint. He emigrated with his family to Sweden in 1987 with help from the Swedish Prime Minister Ingvar Carlsson, and became a Swedish citizen in 1992.

He was a member of the Norwegian Academy of Science and Letters.

References 

Soviet historians
20th-century Swedish historians
Academic staff of Uppsala University
1925 births
2017 deaths
Members of the Norwegian Academy of Science and Letters